Edis Seliminski ( (born 6 September 1990) is a Bulgarian football striker who currently plays for Botev Lukovit.

References

External links
 Profile at Akademik Sofia
PFL.bg statistics
 https://web.archive.org/web/20120927134023/http://cdn.football24.bg/cache/220x0/assets/media/players/3071edis.jpg

1990 births
Living people
Bulgarian footballers
Bulgarian people of Turkish descent
Akademik Sofia players
First Professional Football League (Bulgaria) players
Association football midfielders